The abbreviation DGR can stand for:
 Deep Green Resistance, a radical environmental movement
 Dangerous Goods Regulations, for transport of hazardous substances such as the IATA DGR for transport by air
 Dargaville Aerodrome, New Zealand, IATA code
 David Gilliland Racing, a North American motorsports team
 Dante Gabriel Rossetti, Victorian painter and poet, co-founder of the Pre-Raphaelite Brotherhood
 Distinguished Gentleman's Ride, a worldwide motorcycle event on the last Sunday of September, to raise funds for prostate cancer research
 Diversity-generating retroelement